Parsons is an English surname although it's known to go back several centuries in Southern Ireland (Catholic) as well. The name has an occupational meaning, and refers to a parson's servant or a person who worked in the parson's house. Another meaning of the surname is the parson's son.

Notable people with the surname of Parsons include the following.

Academia and science
Charles Algernon Parsons (1854–1931), Irish engineer, inventor of the steam turbine
Charles Parsons (philosopher) (born 1943), American philosopher
Coleman Parsons (1905–1991), American professor of literature
Elsie Clews Parsons (1875–1941), American anthropologist, sociologist, folklorist, and feminist 
Frederick Gymer Parsons (1863–1943), English writer and scientist
John Herbert Parsons (1863–1957), British ophthalmologist
Peter J. Parsons (1936 - 2022), British classicist and papyrologist 
Talcott Parsons (1902–1979), American sociologist best known for his social action theory and structural functionalism
Terence Parsons (born 1939), American philosopher
Theophilus Parsons (1749–1813), American jurist
Torrence Parsons (1941–1987), American mathematician

Art
Alfred William Parsons (1847-1920), English illustrator, landscape painter, garden designer
Allyson Parsons (born 1965), Australian landscape artist
Beatrice Emma Parsons (1870-1955), English garden painter
Betty Parsons (1900–1982), American artist and art dealer
Elizabeth Parsons (1831–1897), English-Australian artist
Eunice Parsons (born 1916), American modernist collage artist and art teacher.
Peter Parsons (born 1936), ceramic artist

Performing arts
Agnes Parsons, American screenwriter
Andy Parsons (born 1966), English comedian
Charlie Parsons (born 1958), British television producer
Christopher Parsons (1932–2002), English filmmaker and producer
Estelle Parsons (born 1927), Academy Award winning actress
Jim Parsons (born 1973), American television and film actor
Karyn Parsons (born 1966), American film and television actress
Nancy Parsons (1942–2001), American actress
Nicholas Parsons (1923–2020), English actor and radio and television presenter
 Percy Parsons (1878–1944), American actor
 Philip Parsons, Australian drama academic and publisher
Rodger Parsons, American voice actor

Military and diplomacy
Alfred Parsons (diplomat) (1925–2010), Australian diplomat
Francis Newton Parsons, British soldier, awarded the Victoria Cross
Harold Parsons (1863–1925), British Army officer, for whom Parsons Barracks named
Isaac Parsons (American military officer) (1814–1862), Virginia military officer and Virginia House Delegate
Mosby Parsons (1822–1865), U.S. officer in the Mexican–American War

Music
Alan Parsons (born 1948), British musician and record producer
Dave Parsons (born 1966), English bass guitarist
Gary Parsons, American radio executive
Gene Parsons (born 1944), American musician
Geoffrey Parsons (lyricist) (1910–1987), English lyricist
Geoffrey Parsons (pianist) (1929–1995), Australian classical pianist
Gram Parsons (1946–1973), American singer, songwriter, guitarist and pianist
Lynn Parsons, British radio disk jockey
Robert Parsons (composer) (c. 1535 – 1572), English composer
Squire Parsons (born 1949), American gospel singer
Ted Parsons, American drummer

Politicians and activists
Albert Parsons (1848–1887), American labor activist, anarchist newspaper editor, and orator
Andrew Parsons (American politician) (1817–1856), American politician
Cornelius R. Parsons (1842–1901), New York politician
Eileen Parsons, British Virgin Islands politician
Ernie Parsons (born 1946), Canadian JP and politician
Herbert Parsons (New York politician) (1869–1925), U.S. Representative from New York
Herbert Angas Parsons (1872–1945), South Australian lawyer, politician and judge
Isaac Parsons (Virginia politician) (1752–1796), Virginia militia officer and Virginia House Delegate
Jamie Parsons (1941–2015), Alaskan politician
Lewis E. Parsons (1817-1895), American politician, governor of Alabama
Lucy Parsons (1853–1942), American labor organizer, radical socialist and anarcho-communist
Robert E. Parsons (1892-1966), American politician
Sidney Parsons (1893–1955), Canadian politician
Silas Parsons (c. 1800–1860), justice of the Supreme Court of Alabama
Thomas Parsons (politician) (1814–1873), New York politician

Religion
Donald J. Parsons, American Episcopal bishop
Jonathan Parsons (1705–1776), New England clergyman
Robert Persons (1546 – 1610), English Jesuit priest, later known as Robert Parsons

Sports people
Benny Parsons (1941–2007), American NASCAR driver
Bill Parsons (born 1948), American baseball player
Bob Parsons (American football) (born 1950), American football player
Brian Parsons (1933–1999), English cricketer
Buzz Parsons (born 1950), Canadian soccer player 
Casey Parsons, American Major League baseball player
Chandler Parsons (born 1988), American basketball player
David Parsons (cricket coach) (born 1967), English cricket coach
David Parsons (racing driver) (born 1959), Australian racing driver
Donald Parsons, businessman and owner of the Pittsburgh Penguins
Eric Parsons (born 1923), English footballer
Geoff Parsons (born 1964), Scottish high jumper
Herbert Parsons (cricketer) (1875–1937), Australian cricket player for Victoria
Jayne Parsons (born 1962), New Zealand paralympic cyclist
Johnnie Parsons (1918–1984), American race car driver
Johnny Parsons (born 1944), American race car driver
Jordan Parsons (1990−2016) American mixed martial artist
Keith Parsons (born 1973), English cricketer
King Parsons (born 1945), American professional wrestler
Liam Parsons (born 1977), Canadian rower
Lindsay Parsons (born 1946), English footballer
Lucas Parsons (born 1989), Australian professional golfer
Micah Parsons (born 1999), American football player
Phil Parsons (born 1957), American NASCAR driver
Rachel Parsons (born 1997), American figure skater
Sarah Parsons (born 1987), American ice hockey player
Sarah Wilhite Parsons (born 1995), American volleyball player
Zane Parsons (born 1976), Australian rules footballer

Others
Abraham Parsons (died 1785), English commercial consul and traveller
Sir Anthony Parsons (1922–1996), British diplomat, ambassador to Iran and to the United Nations
Bob Parsons (born 1950), American entrepreneur
Chick Parsons (1900–1988), American businessman and diplomat
Clere Parsons, (1908–1931), English poet
Eliza Parsons, (1739–1811), English gothic horror writer
Kathryn Parsons (born 1982), British tech entrepreneur
Louella Parsons (1881–1972), American gossip columnist
Martha Parsons (1869–1965), American businesswoman
Mary Elizabeth Parsons (1859-1947), American author
Randy Parsons (born 1965), American luthier
Rehtaeh Parsons (d. April 7, 2013), bullycide victim
Samuel Parsons (1844–1923), American landscape architect
Samuel Holden Parsons (1737–1789), American lawyer

Fictional characters
Ellen Parsons, one of the main characters in the TV series Damages
Kimberly Parsons (portrayed by Daniella Evangelista]), a character from the movie Cabin by the Lake and its sequel "Return to Cabin by the Lake"
Nicky Parsons (portrayed by Julia Stiles), a character from the Bourne (film series)
Rachel Parsons, a character from the movie Gothika

See also
Parsons (disambiguation)
Don Parsons (disambiguation), multiple people
George Parsons (disambiguation), multiple people
Jack Parsons (disambiguation), multiple people
John Parsons (disambiguation), multiple people
Michael Parsons (disambiguation), multiple people
Richard Parsons (disambiguation), multiple people
Tom Parsons (disambiguation), multiple people
Tony Parsons (disambiguation), multiple people
William Parsons (disambiguation), multiple people

References

English-language surnames
Occupational surnames